The Icelandic Museum of Design and Applied Art is a museum of product and furniture design in the town Garðabær, near Reykjavík in Iceland. The collection was started in 1998, but the museum did not open until 2010. It has a permanent exhibition consisting mainly of Scandinavian design objects of the last hundred years. It also holds events and temporary exhibitions.

Most of the collection was acquired through donations.

{
  "type": "FeatureCollection",
  "features": [
    {
      "type": "Feature",
      "properties": {},
      "geometry": {
        "type": "Point",
        "coordinates": [
          -21.920278073012017,
          64.08902913255274
        ]
      }
    }
  ]
}

References

Museums in Iceland
Design museums
Museums established in 1998